Dell is an unincorporated community in Benton County, Missouri, United States.

A variant name was Dell Delight. A post office called Dell Delight was established in 1866, the name was changed to Dell in 1894, and the post office closed in 1911.

References

Unincorporated communities in Benton County, Missouri
Unincorporated communities in Missouri